Carlo Actis Dato (born March 21, 1952, in Turin) is an Italian jazz saxophonist and composer. His Actis quartet toured worldwide in the 1990s.

Discography

As leader

Carlo Actis Dato quartet 
 Noblesse Oblige (Splasch, 1986)
 Oltremare (Splasch, 1987)
 Ankara twist (Splasch, 1989)
 Badge Boogie (Splasch, 1992)
 Blue Cairo (Splasch, 1995)
 Ginosa Jungle (Splasch, 1998)
 Delhi Mambo (Germany, YVP 1998)
 Fes Montuno (Germany, YVP 2000)
 Istanbul Rap (Germany, YVP 2002)
 Swingin Hanoi (Splasch, 2003)
 Dolce Vita-Musique Vivante (DeeDee, 2006)
 World Tour (CAD, 2009)
 2010 (CAD, 2010)
 Sin Fronteras (LeoR, 2012)

Actis band 
 Son para el Che (Splasc(h), 1997)
 Don Quijote (Splasc(h), 2001)
 Garibaldi  (Leo Records, 2002)
 On tour  (Splasc(h), 2004
 Allende (Leo Records, 2005)
 Cina ! (Leo Records, 2007)

Solo 
 Urartu (LeoR, 1994)
 The Moonwalker (LeoR, 2000)

Atipico Trio 
 Where the reeds dare (splasc(h), 1990)
 Gone with the winds (Splasch(h), 1996)
 Allegro con brio (LeoR, 2004)
 Eqqueqquà ! (LeoR, 2010)

Actis Furioso 
 Avanti popolo ! (Splasc(h),2005)
 World People (LeoR, 2008)

ActisDato/Rocco DUO 
 Paso Doble (Splasc(h), 1997) with Enzo Rocco - guitar
 Paella & Norimaki (Splasc(h), 2000)
 Domestic Rehearsal (cdBaby, 2011)

Martinez/Actis Dato DUO 
 Folklore Imaginario (LeoR, 2004) with Baldo Martinez - double bass
 Sounds from the earth (Universal, 2010)

As sideman 
 Art Studio: The Complete C.M.C. Sessions (Splasc(h), 1978–85)
 Art Studio & Tiziana Ghiglioni: 
 Andrea Centazzo Mitteleuropa Orchestra: Doctor Faustus with Enrico Rava, Carlos Zingaro, Albert Mangelsdorff, Theo Jörgensmann, Gianluigi Trovesi, Franco Feruglio (1984)
 Max Carletti Jazz Trio: baritone sax on “Intro for C.A.D./Tomcat Blues” (1989)
 G.Gaslini Big Band: Mister O (Soul Note,1996)
 Serial Killer: Live in porto (NoMusic, 2002)
 Italian Instabile Orchestra: Skies of Europe (ECM,1994); The Owner of the river bank, w. Cecyl Taylor (ENJA,2000); Creative Orchestra, w. Anthony Braxton (RAITrade,2007); Totally Gone (RAItrade, 2009)
 Enrico Fazio: Euphoria! (CMC,1989); Gracias! (CMC, 1996);Zapping (LeoR,2003)
 Pino Minafra: Sudori (Victo, 1995); Terronia (ENJA, 2004)
 Roy Paci: Corleone (Etna gigante,2004)
 Giorgo Occhipinti Tentet: Global Music (Jazz'halo, 2000)

Others 
 E(x)stinzione Orchestra: Live (Splasc(h), 2012)
 Dune (Splasc(h), 1991) with Laura Culver, Alex Rolle, Massimo Barbiero
 Duo w. Kazutoki Umezu: Wake up with the birds (LeoR, 1998)
 Duo w. Masahiko Satoh: Liberissimo (Baj, 1999)
 TAO w Y.Tachibana & K. Ohta: Tomorrow Night Gig (LeoR. 2001)

References

Italian jazz saxophonists
Male saxophonists
Male jazz musicians
Italian Instabile Orchestra members
Leo Records artists